Eagleson is a surname. Notable people with the surname include:

Alan Eagleson (born 1933), disbarred Canadian lawyer, convicted felon
David Eagleson (1924–2003), judge of the Supreme Court of California from 1987 to 1991
Dylan Eagleson, Irish boxer
Ernest G. Eagleson, mayor of Boise, Idaho, in the 1910s and 1920s
Ryan Eagleson (born 1974), former Irish cricketer
Vashon Eagleson, college football coach for the North Carolina Eagles
Thomas W. Keene (1840–1898), American actor, born Thomas R. Eagleson

See also
Eagleson Road (Ottawa Road #49) in Ottawa's west end in Kanata
Eagleson Station (OC Transpo), in Ottawa, Ontario